J-Wave is a commercial radio station based in Tokyo, Japan, broadcasting on 81.3 FM from the Tokyo Skytree to the Tokyo area. J-Wave airs mostly music, covering a wide range of formats. The station is considered the most popular among FM broadcasts in Tokyo, and has surprised the radio broadcast industry by gaining a higher popularity rate than an AM station (JOQR) in a survey conducted in June 2008.  J-Wave was founded in October 1988 with the callsign of JOAV-FM. It is a member station of the Japan FM League (JFL) commercial radio network.

Features
J-WAVE's slogan is "The Best Music on the Planet." The music format can be considered a Japanese equivalent of the Western concept of Top 40 or CHR radio.

Hundreds of different jingles separate programs from commercials; they are generally played at the same decibel level and are variations on a single melody.  J-Wave has been broadcast via satellite since 1994 and some of its programs also air on some community radio stations in Japan.

History

On December 10, 1987,  J-WAVE was incorporated and started test broadcasts on the FM band at 81.3 MHz on August 1, 1988. On October 1 of that year at 5:00 a.m., it started transmission from Tokyo Tower. J-Wave was the 27th FM radio station nationwide to launch at that time, and the second in Tokyo. The name ”J-WAVE” originally derived from a record shop WAVE in Roppongi, which also belonged to "Saison Group".  While other radio stations focused more on presentation, J-WAVE adopted a "more music less talk" format. The station had a large fanbase because of its unusual programming style, playing music non-stop except for jingles and breaks for news, traffic and weather. The law in Japan at that time stipulated that programming had to be maximum 80% music, and minimum 20% talk and continuity. J-WAVE coined the term "J-pop", which is only vaguely defined but led to the eventual mirror term, K-pop. However, as the years went by, the station lost influence. Sponsor after sponsor pulled their ads because of the growing irrelevance of the programming to what they were selling.

Around 1995, J-WAVE hired new personalities in an attempt to rejuvenate itself. Its term "J-POP" became synonymous with commercially palatable Japanese music from across the spectrum, except for traditional Japanese music. Specials started to air around this time, and the station took steps to attract a listener base desirable for higher ad revenues.
The format J-WAVE introduced to Japan, "more music less talk" almost disappeared during reorganization in early 1997, when DJ banter became more pronounced.

On October 1, 2003, J-WAVE moved its head office to the 33rd floor of the Roppongi Hills Mori Tower in Minato, Tokyo.
On April 23, 2012, J-WAVE moved its transmitting station at Tokyo Tower to the Tokyo Sky Tree with new transmission power of 7 kilowatts with an ERP of 57 kilowatts. Before the move, the transmission power was 10 kilowatts with an ERP of 44 kilowatts.

Today, J-WAVE has changed dramatically since its first broadcast. The station acquired a solid listener base who were less interested in a pretense of social rebellion. Nonetheless, J-Wave has never hit the No. 1 rank in ratings in the last ten years in the Tokyo region.

Navigators (DJs)
(1988-1993) Popular Navigators with "obis", or daily shows, on J-Wave include:
Jon Kabira
Carole Hisasue
Chris Peppler
Cara Jones
Barry White
Mike Rogers (producer)

Programs

Tokio Hot 100

J-WAVE has set up its own airplay charts, which tallies the songs were played the most during that week on its own station. Note: These should not be confused with the Japanese single charts, Oricon, which has its own national airplay charts.

There is also a TV version shown on MTV Japan.

Others
Saude Saudade

Song of the year (Slam Jam)
1988: U2 — "Desire"
1989: Prince — "Batdance"
1990: Madonna — "Vogue"
1991: Stevie B — "Because I Love You (The Postman Song)"
1992: Shanice — "I Love Your Smile"
1993: Mariah Carey — "Dreamlover"
1994: Big Mountain — "Baby I Love Your Way"
1995: Diana King — "Shy Guy"
1996: Eric Clapton — "Change the World"
1997: Jamiroquai — "Cosmic Girl"
1998: Celine Dion — "My Heart Will Go On"
1999: Jamiroquai — "Canned Heat"
2000: Madonna — "Music"
2001: Janet Jackson — "All for You"
2002: Underworld — "Two Months Off"
2003: Beyoncé Knowles featuring Jay-Z — "Crazy in Love"
2004: Avril Lavigne — "Don't Tell Me"
2005: Def Tech — "My Way"
2006: Sharlene — "Sweeta Sweeta"
2007: Beyoncé — Irreplaceable
2008: Leona Lewis - Bleeding Love

Notes

External links
 
Links to other Japan FM League stations on J-Wave website 

Radio stations in Japan
Radio stations established in 1988
Mass media companies based in Tokyo
Contemporary hit radio stations
Roppongi